Healesville Sanctuary, formally known as the Sir Colin MacKenzie Sanctuary, is a zoo specialising in native Australian animals. It is located at Healesville in rural Victoria, Australia, and has a history of breeding native animals. It is one of only two places to have successfully bred a platypus, the other being Sydney's Taronga Zoo. It also assists with a breeding population of the endangered helmeted honeyeater.

The zoo is set in a natural bushland environment where paths wind through different habitat areas showcasing wallabies, wombats, dingoes, kangaroos, and over 200 native bird varieties.

Guided tours, bird shows and information areas are available to visitors.

History

The Reserve passed to the Healesville Council in 1927 and became the Sir Colin MacKenzie Sanctuary in 1934.

The first platypus bred in captivity was born in the Sanctuary in year 1943 when it was managed by David Fleay.

The park was placed under the management of the Victorian Zoological Parks and Gardens Board on 27 June 1978.

In 2009, the sanctuary was threatened by the Black Saturday bushfires, and the sanctuary evacuated their threatened species to Melbourne Zoo.

Animals and exhibits

General exhibits

 Spotted-tailed quoll
 Tasmanian devil
 Dingo
 Emu
 Powerful owl

 Eastern barn owl
 Laughing kookaburra
 Helmeted honeyeater
 Apostlebird
 Eastern blue-tongued lizard

 Ridge-tailed monitor
 Lace monitor
 Jacky lizard
 Burton's legless lizard
 Common death adder

Koalas
 Koala
 Short-beaked echidna
 Parma wallaby
 Tasmanian pademelon

Birds of the bush
 Orange-bellied parrot
 Swift parrot
 Rose-crowned fruit-dove
 Fan-tailed cuckoo
 Eastern whipbird

Kangaroos
 Red kangaroo
 Western grey kangaroo

Gang-gang Aviary
 Gang-gang cockatoo
 Bush stone-curlew

World of the Platypus/Platypusary
 Platypus
 Water rat
 Gippsland water dragon
 Short-finned eel
 Macquarie perch
 Yabby
 Murray crayfish

Woodland Aviary

 Painted buttonquail
 Musk lorikeet
 Purple-crowned lorikeet
 Common bronzewing

 Crested pigeon
 Peaceful dove
 Sacred kingfisher
 Variegated fairy-wren

 Eastern yellow robin
 Satin bowerbird
 White-browed woodswallow
 Chestnut-breasted mannikin

Rock-wallaby
 Brush-tailed rock-wallaby
 Australian pelican
 Black swan
 Chestnut teal
 Dusky moorhen
 Magpie goose
 Pacific black duck
 Purple swamphen
 Australian white ibis

Arid Birds
 Scarlet-chested parrot
 Princess parrot
 Budgerigar
 Rainbow bee-eater
 Variegated fairy-wren
 Gouldian finch
 Diamond firetail
 Painted finch

Wetlands Aviary
 Glossy ibis
 Yellow-billed spoonbill
 Cattle egret

Wallabies
 Parma wallaby
 Red-necked wallaby
 Swamp wallaby

Wombat Closeup
 Common wombat
 Short-beaked echidna
 Brolga

Animals of the Night

 Northern quoll
 Agile antechinus
 Fat-tailed dunnart
 Greater bilby
 Squirrel glider

 Sugar glider
 Mountain pygmy-possum
 Feathertail glider
 Rufous bettong
 Long-nosed potoroo
 Eastern quoll

 Spinifex hopping-mouse
 Barn owl
 Australian green tree frog
 Peron's tree frog
 Marbled velvet gecko

 Golden spiny-tailed gecko
 Smooth knob-tailed gecko

Cockatoos
 Red-tailed black cockatoo

 Major Mitchell's cockatoo
 Australian brush-turkey
 White-headed pigeon 
 Brush bronzewing
 Wonga pigeon
 Pacific emerald dove
 Blue-faced honeyeater
 Black-faced cuckoo-shrike

Reptile Encounter

 Brown tree snake
 Broad-headed snake
 Chappell Island tiger snake
 Eastern bearded dragon
 Eastern blue-tongued lizard

 Eastern water skink
 Eastern brown snake
 Freshwater crocodile
 Frill-necked lizard
 Green tree frog

 Mertens' water monitor
 Mangrove monitor
 Painted turtle
 Pink-tongued lizard
 Red-bellied black snake

 Rusty desert monitor
 Spotted tree monitor
 Coastal taipan

Lyrebird Forest

 Superb lyrebird
 Australian king parrot
 White-headed pigeon
 Wonga pigeon

 Brush bronzewing
 Pacific emerald dove
 Superb fairy-wren
 Bell miner

 White-naped honeyeater
 Satin bowerbird

Larger Wetlands Aviary

 Australasian shoveller
 Black swan
 Blue-billed duck
 Chestnut teal
 Darter

 Freckled duck
 Great cormorant
 Great egret
 Grey teal
 Little pied cormorant

 Magpie goose
 Pied cormorant
 Pied heron
 Plumed whistling-duck
 Royal spoonbill

 Straw-necked ibis
 White-faced heron

Flying Foxes
 Grey-headed flying-fox
 Black-winged stilt

References

External links

1934 establishments in Australia
Zoos established in 1934
Zoos in Victoria (Australia)
Wildlife parks in Australia
Tourist attractions in Victoria (Australia)
Yarra Valley